The men's 1500 metres in short track speed skating at the 2010 Winter Olympics took place on February 13 at the Pacific Coliseum. Heats took place at 5:00 PM PST, while the semifinals took place at 6:18 PM PST and the final event one hour later at 7:18 PM PST.

Preview
Going into the competition, speculation about possible winners focused on the strong South Korean contingent and on American skater Apolo Ohno. The South Korean team dominated short track speed skating at the 2006 Winter Olympics, winning six gold, three silver, and two bronze medals in the eight events. Their team at the 2010 games also included a number of skaters who were reigning world champions. Ohno received significant media attention both because of previous successes at the 2002 Winter Olympics and 2006 Games and because he was in a position to break two records, the most medals won by a short track speed skater, and the most medals won by any winter Olympian from the United States.

Qualifying heats
Following the semifinal round, seven skaters qualified for the final medal round: Lee Jung-su, Lee Ho-suk and Sung Si-bak of South Korea, Apolo Ohno and J. R. Celski of the United States, Liang Wenhao of China, and Olivier Jean of Canada. Jean actually placed seventh in his semifinal heat, but advanced to the medal race after judges ruled that he had been interfered with during the race.

Final heat and results

The South Korean skaters and Ohno jostled for the lead during much of the race, switching the lead positions multiple times. Entering the final lap, the three South Koreans had passed Ohno and were in a position to sweep the medals in the event. However, at the entrance of the last corner on the final lap, Lee Ho-suk made a last-minute daring inside pass on Sung Si-bak, only to have his blade collide with Si-bak to cause both skaters to fall and slam into the barriers. This allowed Ohno and his fellow American skater J. R. Celski to move into second and third positions behind the eventual winner, Lee Jung-su. Lee Ho-suk was later disqualified by judges for causing the crash, and Sung Si-bak took fifth place.

Following the race, gold medalist Lee Jung-su told the media that he did not feel good about his win because of his teammates' misfortune. He credited his win to a decision to start the race in the front of the pack, which was not his usual technique. With his second-place finish and his sixth medal, Ohno became the most medaled short track speed skater in Olympic history, and tied Bonnie Blair's record as the most medaled American winter Olympian. Celski, who was skating after recovering from an accident the previous fall in which a skate's blade had sliced into his leg, earned his first medal.

Haralds Silovs became the first athlete in Olympic history to participate in both short track and long track (5000 m) speed skating, and the first to compete in two different disciplines on the same day. He competed in the 5000 m and then raced across town to the 1500 m event.

Results

Heats

Semifinals

Finals

Final B (classification round)

Final A (medal round)

References

External links
 2010 Winter Olympics results: Men's 1500 m Heats, from http://www.vancouver2010.com/ ; retrieved 2010-02-13.
 2010 Winter Olympics results: Men's 1500 m Semifinals , from http://www.vancouver2010.com/ ; retrieved 2010-02-13.
 2010 Winter Olympics results: Men's 1500 m Finals , from http://www.vancouver2010.com/; retrieved 2010-02-13.

Men's short track speed skating at the 2010 Winter Olympics